CIUR-FM is a Canadian radio station broadcasting at 104.7 FM in Winnipeg, Manitoba with a country format branded as Now Country 104.7 FM. The station broadcasts from 1507 Inkster Blvd along with sister station CICY-FM, while its transmitter is located on Nassau Avenue in the Roslyn neighbourhood of Winnipeg.

History
In 2008, CIUR-FM was licensed by the CRTC to operate at 104.7 FM.

The station began testing its signal in early 2009, and officially began broadcasting on December 14 of that year. The station launched with a Rhythmic/Urban contemporary format aimed primarily, but not exclusively, at First Nations youth, and was branded as "Streetz 104.7."

On April 7, 2014, CIUR-FM rebranded as Rhythm 104.7, and retained some on-air personalities. The station changed its target demographic from 18–30 to a 25-40 range, with its focus shifting towards a more mainstream rhythmic CHR format. CIUR was the second Rhythmic CHR station in Canada, the other being CFXJ in Toronto.

On July 9, 2016, at midnight, CIUR-FM flipped to country, branded as Now Country 104.7 FM.

Brands

References

External links
Now Country 104.7 FM
Facebook

Iur
Iur
Radio stations established in 2009
2009 establishments in Manitoba